The Advanced Plant Management System (APMS) is a SCADA solution developed in partnership by RWE npower and Thales UK.

Based on a real-time application platform, APMS is a monitoring and control system for any large industrial process. APMS is implemented at more than thirty electric power generation units in the UK, including Tilbury, Didcot A, Aberthaw, Drax and Rugeley power stations.

The APMS system replaced the Cutlass programming language and application system - a real-time control system widely implemented during the 1970s in British power plants by the Central Electricity Generating Board (CEGB) research & development team - in National Power power stations. (PowerGen in contrast retained and modernised its Cutlass systems.)

See also
 npower UK
 Aberthaw power stations
 Didcot power stations
 Fiddlers Ferry power station
 Ironbridge power stations
 Drax power station
 APMS replacing CUTLASS system

References

External links
 APMS: Advanced Plant Management System
 Thales UK
 RWE npower
 npower

Industrial automation
Telemetry
Power station technology